Rajajinagar, officially Rajajinagara is a residential neighborhood and business hub in the west of Bangalore. It is one of the zones of BBMP. It is bordered by Basaveshwaranagara, Malleshwara, Mahalakshmipura alias West of Chord road second stage, Mahalakshmi Layout, Vijayanagara and Rajajinagara Industrial Suburb. It serves as a centre place to all in Bengaluru.

Inaugurated by Maharaja's of Mysuru Jayachamaraja Wadiyar, Rajajinagara Pillar on 03/07/1949. 70th birthday to C Rajagopalachari.

Named after statesman C. Rajagopalachari, a plaque in the Rajajinagara pillar indicates that 1,000 acres of land given for the locality was divided into industrial and housing areas. The former consisted of 140 acres for textiles, 220 acres for machinery, 100 acres for chemical plants and 40 acres for the food sector. About 4,000 housing plots were created in the remaining 500 acres. Rajajinagara was built at an estimated cost of Rs 50 lakh.

References

External links 

Neighbourhoods in Bangalore
Memorials to C. Rajagopalachari